Restaurant Revolution was an Australian cooking reality television series which screened on the Seven Network in 2015. The show consisted of five teams of one, two, three or four people with a pre-existing relationship competing to turn their vision for a restaurant into a reality. The teams were given the chance to design and run their own pop-up restaurant with viewers able to dine in and experience the food, service and atmosphere. The show was hosted by Scottish-born restaurateur Jock Zonfrillo.

Teams are scored and judged by a panel of experts. The industry expert panel consists of Neil Perry (chef and restaurateur), Erez Gordon (front-of-house specialist), John Lethlean (food critic) and Jess Ho (brand strategist). They were also scored on how much profit they made each week.

Restaurants and contestants
The teams were from the five largest capital cities in Australia. Their restaurants were constructed out of shipping containers located in an iconic spot for each city. The layout for every restaurant was identical and each seated 60 guests. It was up to the teams to determine the theme, atmosphere, exterior and interior details of their restaurants. All restaurants officially opened to the public on 14 July, a few weeks before they aired on the show.

Competition details
 Restaurant Pre-opening - During this first stage of the competition, teams must earn cash to be able to build the interior of their restaurants, purchase supplies and prepare their  staff. For each of the first two challenges, there was a total cash pool of $100,000 on offer. The experts distributed this cash based on how well the teams pitch or present their potential restaurant, food and service. The team who best meets the expert's requirements receives $40,000, second receives $20,000, third and fourth get $15,000 each and finally the worst performing team receives only $10,000. In the final 'last chance pitch', the experts only gave a total of $40,000 to the three best teams, with two teams missing out on the final cash offer.
 Team Lunch - Each week, one team hosts a lunch inviting in all other teams, where they will be able to judge the food and service of each competing restaurant. Teams are given $50 to use for tips, which they can use up to all or none of. This process happens alongside the Weekly reviews. In Week 5, it was revealed that for every $10 tip, the team earns 1 point on their final scores.
 Weekly Reviews - The experts will individually visit each of the restaurants on a weekly rotation. They judge the food and service based on their visit and give the team an overall score out of 10. A 5th 'secret critic' also joins the experts judging one team a week. Their identity remains anonymous, therefore teams do not know when or who will arrive to judge. Teams are also ranked for their profitability, with the team earning the highest profit margin getting 5 points added to the expert score and then the other teams ranked 4 to 1 point/s. The team with the highest overall score will gain one extra 4 seat table to use for the following week's service, while the lowest scoring team, loses a 4-seat table, which remains present but is taped off as if it was damaged.  From Week 2, there are also chef's special challenges. The team who sells the most of this dish earns 2 bonus points on top of their profit score.
 Week 2 Chef's Special – Teams are to create a 'chef's special' dish. It must be completely new and not a variation of their existing menu, priced at no lower than $15. 
 Week 3 Chef's Special – 'State on a plate'. Teams must create a special dish that represents their home state.
 Week 4 Chef's Special — Teams must create a burger that represents their restaurant.

Episodes and ratings
Restaurant Revolution suffered low ratings during its launch. As a result, Seven has taken action by reducing the show's running from four to two to just one night a week. The program also moved starting time.

See also
 My Kitchen Rules
 My Restaurant Rules
 MasterChef Australia
 The Hot Plate

References 

Seven Network original programming
2015 Australian television series debuts
2015 Australian television series endings
2010s Australian reality television series
Australian cooking television series
Television shows set in Australia